Radium is the third album of Finnish industrial metal band Ruoska; it was released on 22 March 2005. Two remixes of the song "Kosketa" were included on the Tuonen viemää and Helvettiin jäätynyt singles. A remix of "Irti" was also included on Helvettiin jäätynyt single.

Track listing
"Veriura"  ('Fuller') - 4:20
"Kosketa" ('Touch') - 3:51
"Käärmeenpesä" ('Serpent's Nest') - 4:57 
"Irti" ('Off!') - 3:43
"Tuonen viemää" (Taken by death) - 3:47
"Kiiraslapsi" ('Purgatory Child') - 3:55
"Multaa ja loskaa" ('Soil and Slush') - 3:52
"Narua" ('String') - 3:59
"Rumavirsi" ('Ugly Hymn') - 3:25
"Herraa hyvää kiittäkää" ('Thank the Good Lord') - 3:29
"Isän kädestä" ('By fathers hand') - 4:01

Line-up 
During the album recording, these were the band members:
Patrik Mennander (vocals)
Anssi Auvinen (guitar)
Kai Ahvenranta (guitar)
Mika Kamppi (bass)
Sami Karppinen (drums)

Music videos
The only song from this album made into a music video is "Tuonen viemää".

References
 Radium at Epe's Music Store Suomi

External links
English fansite

Ruoska albums
2005 albums